Dinesh Kumar Khara (born 28 August 1961) is a career banker and Chairman of the State Bank of India a position he assumed on 7 October 2020.

Education
He is a postgraduate in Commerce from Delhi School of Economics and an MBA from the Faculty of Management Studies, New Delhi. He is also a Certified Associate of the Indian Institute of Bankers (CAIIB).

Career 
Khara joined SBI in 1984 as a Probationary Officer. He has held several key positions such as MD (Global Banking & Subsidiaries), MD (Associates & Subsidiaries), MD & CEO (SBI Mutual Funds) and Chief General Manager – Bhopal Circle. He was also posted in SBI, Chicago for an overseas assignment. As Managing Director, he led the International Banking Group, Corporate Banking and Global Treasury Operations, as well as the non-banking subsidiaries of the Bank viz., SBI Cards, SBIMF, SBI Life Insurance and SBI General Insurance, etc. He executed the merger of five Subsidiary Banks of SBI and Bhartiya Mahila Bank with SBI. Additionally, he headed the Risk, IT and Compliance functions of the bank at various points.

References 

1961 births
Chairmen of the State Bank of India
Delhi School of Economics alumni
Faculty of Management Studies – University of Delhi alumni
Indian chairpersons of corporations
Living people